The Dominican Republic women's national basketball team participates in international competitions.

Results

FIBA Americas Championship
 1989 – 6th place
 1997 – 8th place
 1999 – 6th place
 2003 – 7th place
 2005 – 6th place
 2009 – 8th place
 2013 – 9th place
 2015 – 10th place
 2019 – 7th place
 2021 – 7th place

Pan American Games
 1975 – 7th place
 1999 – 6th place
 2003 – 6th place
 2015 – 8th place

Centrobasket
 1971 – 5th
 1973 – 4th
 1975 – 3rd 
 1977 – 2nd 
 1981 – 4th
 1985 – 3rd 
 1989 – 2nd 
 1993 – 4th
 1995 – 3rd 
 1997 – 3rd 
 1999 – 2nd 
 2003 – 2nd 
 2008 – 3rd 
 2010 – 5th
 2012 – 3rd 
 2014 – 3rd

Current roster
Roster for the 2021 FIBA Women's AmeriCup.

References

External links

FIBA profile
Dominican Republic at FIBA Americas

Women's national basketball teams
National team
Basketball